The St. Gallen trolleybus system forms part of the public transport network of St. Gallen, the capital city of the canton of St. Gallen, Switzerland.

History
The last tram ran on 30 September 1957. The individual trolleybus line sections went into service as follows:

Lines 

The present system is made up of the following lines:

To this day, the Trogenerbahn (Trogen Railway) runs through the inner city between the station and Brühltor on the rails of the former tramway, and thus parallel to the trolleybuses. The two modes of transport still share a common electrical substation. In the relevant section of the common route, the overhead wire voltage is only 600 V DC, as is the rest of the trolleybus system. By contrast, the remainder of the Trogenerbahn route was energised at 1,000 V DC. It now forms part of the Appenzell–St. Gallen–Trogen railway and the section that was energised at 1,000 V DC, is now energised at 1,500 V DC.

In Riethüsli, the terminus of Line 5, there is an interchange station for changing between the trolleybus system and the electrically operated Appenzell–St. Gallen–Trogen railway.

Line 4 has existed only since 9 December 2007. Previously, line 1 had had three different termini from 1991, and four from 1996.

Fleet

Retired fleet 

The original group numbered 101–118, the fleet that opened the system in 1950, were rebodied by Hess between 1968 and 1975 and fitted with a new backup battery.  They were simultaneously renumbered as fleet nos. 131–148, but not in the same sequence.  Trailer operations ended either in 1991 or in March 1992.

Disposal abroad 

 In 1992, all twelve trolleybuses of the 1957–58 series were sold, together with the 1969–70 trailers, to the Warsaw trolleybus system in Poland, and were placed in service.  That system was nevertheless closed soon afterwards, in 1995. One of the former St. Gallen/Warsaw trolleybuses (No. 128) was sold in 2001 to the Gdynia trolleybus system, also in Poland, where it later came into use as a heritage vehicle, renumbered 3300, operating service occasionally. By 2012, its original, St. Gallen fleet number of 128 had been restored.
 Trolleybuses 142, 143, 144, 146 and 147 were sold in 1992 to the Valparaíso trolleybus system in Chile, but they were used in service there only briefly – most in 1992 only, with one (142) in sporadic use until 1995 or early 1996. Since 17 November 2008, ex-St. Gallen trolleybus no. 142 has been used there as a staff break room and souvenir sales outlet at the Barón terminus.
 Nine type GT 560/620-25 Saurer/Hess trolleybuses (nos. 102–108, 110 and 111) were donated by the VBSG to the Plovdiv trolleybus system in Bulgaria in 2008 and 2009.

Current fleet 
A total of 25 trolleybuses are currently available for use on the St. Gallen system; a maximum of 21 are required simultaneously. The present fleet comprises 17 articulated buses and eight bi-articulated buses, all of which are of low-floor design:

Fleet no. 155, which was originally a single-articulated, high-floor trolleybus, is an exceptional vehicle.  Fourteen years after its entry into service, it was lengthened into a bi-articulated vehicle, by the addition of a second, low-floor, trailing segment. Simultaneously, its designation was changed from BGT 5-25 to BGGT 5-25.

Originally it was planned to carry out a similar conversion to eight or nine other vehicles of this type.  However, due to technical problems with the prototype, it was decided instead to purchase the seven brand-new bi-articulated trolleybuses, nos. 188 to 194.

The bi-articulated vehicles provide a large proportion of the services on lines 1 and 4, although no. 155 runs solely on line 1. By contrast, only normal articulated trolleybuses are used on lines 3 and 5, except on one occasion when bi-articulated vehicles were used on line 3 during a special exhibition.

See also

List of trolleybus systems in Switzerland

References

Notes

Further reading

External links

 
 

St. Gallen (city)
St. Gallen
St. Gallen
1950 establishments in Switzerland